William Pritchard Coe briefly served as Governor of Guam during 1899.  He served in this position for two weeks.  Previously Coe had lived in Samoa. Coe  was the son of the American merchant and Consul Jonas Mynderse Coe who was born February 12, 1823, in Troy, New York and his first wife, Le'uta Malietoa born in Salesatele, Samoa the daughter of a chief.

See also 
 List of minority governors and lieutenant governors in the United States

References
WILLIAM PRITCHARD COE
The Coe Families of Maryland and Virginia

 
 

1857 births
1909 deaths
Governors of Guam